Emanuele Liuzzi (born 22 December 1990) is an Italian rower. He competed in the men's eight event at the 2016 Summer Olympics.

References

External links
 

1990 births
Living people
Italian male rowers
Olympic rowers of Italy
Rowers at the 2016 Summer Olympics
Place of birth missing (living people)
World Rowing Championships medalists for Italy
Rowers of Fiamme Oro
Rowers from Naples
2021 America's Cup sailors
Italian male sailors (sport)
Luna Rossa Challenge sailors
20th-century Italian people
21st-century Italian people